Robert Anderson (June 14, 1805 – October 26, 1871) was a United States Army officer during the American Civil War. He was the Union commander in the first battle of the American Civil War at Fort Sumter in April 1861 when the Confederates bombarded the fort and forced its surrender to start the war. Anderson was celebrated as a hero in the North and promoted to brigadier general and given command of Union forces in Kentucky. He was removed late in 1861 and reassigned to Rhode Island, before retiring from military service in 1863.

Early life and career
Anderson was born at "Soldier's Retreat," the Anderson family estate near Louisville, Kentucky. His father, Richard Clough Anderson Sr. (1750–1826), served in the Continental Army as an aide-de-camp to the Marquis de Lafayette during the American Revolutionary War, and was a charter member of the Society of the Cincinnati; his mother, Sarah Marshall (1779–1854), was a cousin of John Marshall, the fourth Chief Justice of the United States.  He graduated from the United States Military Academy (West Point) in 1825, and received a commission as a second lieutenant in the 3rd Regiment of Artillery.

A few months after graduation, he became a private secretary to his older brother Richard Clough Anderson, Jr., who was serving as the US Minister to Gran Colombia. He served in the Black Hawk War of 1832 as a colonel of Illinois volunteers, where he had the distinction of twice mustering Abraham Lincoln in and once out of army service.  He also was in charge of transporting Black Hawk to Jefferson Barracks after his capture, assisted by Jefferson Davis.

Returning to regular Army service as a first lieutenant in 1833, he served in the Second Seminole War as an assistant adjutant general on the staff of Winfield Scott, and was promoted to captain in October 1841.

In the Mexican–American War, he participated in the Siege of Vera Cruz, March 9–29, 1847, the Battle of Cerro Gordo, April 17–18, 1847, the Skirmish of Amazoque, May 14, 1847, and Battle of Molino del Rey on September 8, 1847. He was severely wounded at Molino del Rey while assaulting enemy fortifications, for which he received a brevet promotion to major.

Due to his wounds, Anderson was on sick leave of absence during 1847–48. He was then in garrison at Fort Preble, Maine from 1848 to 1849.  He then served from 1849 to 1851 as a member of the Board of Officers to devise "A Complete System of Instruction for Siege, Garrison, Seacoast, and Mountain Artillery," which was adopted on May 10, 1851. He then returned to garrison duty at Fort Preble from 1850 to 1853.

From 1855 to 1859, in view of his precarious health and probably also due to his connections to General Winfield Scott, Anderson was assigned to the light duty of inspecting the iron beams produced in a mill in Trenton, New Jersey for Federal construction projects. (While residing in Trenton, Anderson became a Freemason and was a member of Mercer Lodge No. 50.) He eventually received a permanent promotion to major of the 1st Regiment of Artillery in the Regular Army on October 5, 1857. He was the author of Instruction for Field Artillery, Horse and Foot in 1839.

Civil War

Fort Sumter

In November 1860, Anderson was assigned to command of U.S. forces in and around Charleston, South Carolina. When South Carolina seceded in December 1860, Anderson remained loyal to the Union although he was a native of Kentucky and a former slaveowner.  He moved his small garrison from Fort Moultrie, which was indefensible, to the more modern and more defensible Fort Sumter, in the middle of Charleston Harbor. In February 1861, the Confederate States of America was formed and took charge. Confederate President Jefferson Davis ordered for the fort be captured. The artillery attack was commanded by Brigadier General P. G. T. Beauregard, who had been Anderson's student at West Point. The attack began April 12, 1861, and continued until Anderson, badly outnumbered and outgunned, surrendered the fort on April 13. The battle began the American Civil War. No one was killed in the battle on either side, but one Union soldier was killed and another was mortally wounded during a 100-gun salute.

Status as national hero
Anderson's actions in defense of Fort Sumter made him an immediate national hero. He was promoted to brigadier general in the Regular Army, effective May 15. Anderson took the fort's 33-star flag with him to New York City, where he participated in a Union Square patriotic rally that was the largest public gathering in North America until then.

Symbolism of the American flag
The modern meaning of the American flag, according to Harold Holzer in 2007 and Adam Goodheart in 2011, was forged by Anderson's stand at Fort Sumter. Holzer states that New York City:

During the war, the flag was used throughout the North to symbolize American nationalism and the rejection of secessionism. Goodheart explained that the flag was transformed into a sacred symbol of patriotism:
Before that day, the flag had served mostly as a military ensign or a convenient marking of American territory ... and displayed on special occasions like the Fourth of July. But in the weeks after Major Anderson's surprising stand, it became something different. Suddenly the Stars and Stripes flew ... from houses, from storefronts, from churches; above the village greens and college quads. ... [T]hat old flag meant something new. The abstraction of the Union cause was transfigured into a physical thing: strips of cloth that millions of people would fight for, and many thousands die for.

Assignments
Anderson then went on a highly-successful recruiting tour of the North. His next assignment placed him in another sensitive political position as commander of the Department of Kentucky (subsequently renamed the Department of the Cumberland), in a border state that had officially declared neutrality between the warring parties. He started to serve  in that position from May 28, 1861. Historians commonly attribute failing health as the reason for his relinquishment of command to Brigadier General William T. Sherman, on October 7, 1861, but a letter from Joshua Fry Speed, Lincoln's close friend, suggests that Lincoln preferred Anderson's removal.

Speed met with Anderson and found him reluctant to implement Lincoln's wishes to distribute rifles to Unionists in Kentucky. Anderson, Speed wrote to Lincoln on October 8, "seemed grieved that [he] had to surrender his command ... [but] agreed that it was necessary and gracefully yielded."

In 1862, Anderson was elected an honorary member of the New York Society of the Cincinnati in which his grandnephew, Ambassador Larz Anderson, was highly active.

Anderson's last military assignment was a brief period as commanding officer of Fort Adams in Newport, Rhode Island, in August 1863.  Anderson officially retired from the Army on October 27, 1863 "for Disability resulting from Long and Faithful Service, and Wounds and disease contracted in the Line of Duty," but he continued to serve on the staff of the general commanding the Eastern Department, headquartered in New York City, from October 27, 1863 to January 22, 1869.  On February 3, 1865, Anderson was brevetted a major general for "gallantry and meritorious service" in the defense of Fort Sumter.

Later life

After Robert E. Lee's surrender at Appomattox and the effective conclusion of the war, at the behest of Secretary of War Edwin Stanton, Anderson returned to Charleston in uniform. Four years after lowering the 33-star flag in surrender, Anderson raised it in triumph over the recaptured but badly battered Fort Sumter. However, hours after the ceremony of April 14, 1865, John Wilkes Booth assassinated President Lincoln.

After the war, Anderson became a companion of the Military Order of the Loyal Legion of the United States. In 1869, he discussed the future of the U.S. Army with Sylvanus Thayer. Afterward, they helped establish the Military Academy's Association of Graduates (AoG).

In 1869 Anderson was reported to have sold his library and moved to Europe, "as half pay would not support his family here". Someone questioning his need informed us that Anderson's half salary as brigadier general was $4,125.

Anderson died in Nice, France in 1871, seeking a cure for his ailments. He was interred at West Point Cemetery.

Family

Anderson's brother, Charles Anderson, served as Governor of Ohio from 1865 to 1866. A second brother, Larz Anderson II was the father of Nicholas Longworth Anderson who served as a general in the Union Army.  Nicholas' son, Larz Anderson III, was a diplomat and a leading member of the Society of the Cincinnati.

Another brother, William Marshall Anderson, was a Western explorer and Ohio attorney. A zealous Catholic and Confederate sympathizer, he briefly moved to Mexico during the reign of Emperor Maximilian in hopes of establishing a Confederate colony there. W. Marshall Anderson's son, Thomas M. Anderson, was a brigadier general who fought in the Spanish–American War and Philippine–American War.

In 1845, Anderson married Eliza Bayard Clinch (1828–1905), the daughter of Duncan Lamont Clinch.  They were the parents of five children: Marie (1849–1925), Sophie (1852–1934), Eliza, Robert Jr. (1859–1879) and Duncan. Anderson was the great-grandfather of actor Montgomery Clift through his daughter Maria, although this relationship has not been definitively established by genealogical sources.  Allegedly, the doctor who delivered Ethel Anderson Clift told her when she was an adult that she was the illegitimate daughter of Maria Anderson and Woodbury Blair, but no documentation exists to verify the relationship. Nonetheless, the legend continues. Virtually all sources that advance this theory reference Ethel's own statements or Clift's biographies.<ref>Bosworth, Patricia, Montgomery Clift: A Biography.</ref>

See also

 List of American Civil War generals (Union)

Notes

References
 Eicher, John H., and Eicher, David J., Civil War High Commands, Stanford University Press, 2001, .
 Lawton, Eba Anderson, Major Robert Anderson and Fort Sumter, 1861 (New York, 1911).
 Silkenat, David. Raising the White Flag: How Surrender Defined the American Civil War. Chapel Hill: University of North Carolina Press, 2019. .
 Warner, Ezra J., Generals in Blue: Lives of the Union Commanders'', Louisiana State University Press, 1964, .
 
 Civil War Officers
 Robert Anderson to Abraham Lincoln, September 16, 1861, and Joshua F. Speed to Lincoln, October 7, 1861, both in Abraham Lincoln Papers, Library of Congress.

Obituaries
 
 }

Popular culture
In 1861 Stephen Glover wrote a march which Oliver Ditson called the 
"Fort Sumpter(sic) Grand March" 
and dedicated it to Maj. Robert Anderson.
In that same year Mr. Glover also wrote a Quick Step which Oliver Ditson called "Maj. Anderson's Quick Step".

1805 births
1871 deaths
Union Army generals
Military personnel from Louisville, Kentucky
People of Kentucky in the American Civil War
American military personnel of the Mexican–American War
United States Military Academy alumni
American people of the Black Hawk War
Burials at West Point Cemetery
American people of the Seminole Wars
Southern Unionists in the American Civil War
American slave owners

it:Robert Anderson